is a Japanese actor and tarento. He is represented with Stardust Promotion (formerly represented with Hoei TV Production). He is nicknamed .

Filmography

TV drama

Documentaries

Variety

Films

Photo albums

Magazines

Stage

Internet

Music videos

See also
3B's members (Kinpachi-sensei's dance unit during the seventh series)
Kojiro Suzuki – Kota Yabu

References

External links
 

21st-century Japanese male actors
Japanese male child actors
Japanese male film actors
Japanese male stage actors
Japanese male television actors
Stardust Promotion artists
People from Tokushima (city)
1991 births
Living people